Dylan Lee Floro (born December 27, 1990) is an American  professional baseball pitcher for the Miami Marlins of Major League Baseball (MLB). He previously played for the Tampa Bay Rays, Chicago Cubs, Cincinnati Reds and Los Angeles Dodgers. He played college baseball for the Cal State Fullerton Titans. Floro was drafted by the Rays in the 13th round of the 2012 MLB draft, and made his MLB debut in 2016.

Amateur career
Floro attended Buhach Colony High School in Atwater, California. During his high school career he had a 33–5 win–loss record.

He was drafted by the Tampa Bay Rays in the 20th round of the 2009 Major League Baseball draft but did not sign and attended California State University Fullerton to play college baseball. He played for the Titans from 2010 to 2012. During his career he went 21–8 with a 3.29 earned run average (ERA) and 178 strikeouts. In 2011, he played collegiate summer baseball for the Hyannis Harbor Hawks of the Cape Cod Baseball League.

Professional career

Tampa Bay Rays
Floro was again drafted by the Rays, this time in the 13th round of the 2012 MLB draft. This time he signed with the Rays and made his professional debut that season with the Hudson Valley Renegades. Pitching for the Bowling Green Hot Rods and Charlotte Stone Crabs in 2013, Floro went 11–2 with a 1.77 ERA and was named the Rays Minor League Pitcher of the Year. In 2014, he pitched for the Double-A Montgomery Biscuits. In 2015, he pitched for the Triple-A Durham Bulls and was 9-12 with a 5.02 ERA.

Floro was called up to the Major Leagues on July 6, 2016. He made his major league debut on July 7 against the Angels.  In 2016 with the Rays he was 0-1 with a 4.20 ERA.

Chicago Cubs
Floro was waived by the Rays and claimed by the Chicago Cubs on January 17, 2017, and was designated for assignment on February 1. He cleared waivers and was assigned to the Triple-A Iowa Cubs on February 4. The Cubs promoted Floro to the major leagues on May 8. In 2017 with the Cubs he was 0-0 with a 6.52 ERA.

Los Angeles Dodgers
Floro was claimed off waivers by the Los Angeles Dodgers on August 4, 2017, pitched 8 games for their AAA team and was 0-1 with a 5.56 ERA, and was designated for assignment on August 18, 2017.

Cincinnati Reds
On January 3, 2018, Floro signed a minor league contract with the Cincinnati Reds. He had his contract purchased on April 13, 2018. In 25 appearances, he was 3-2 in  innings.

Return to the Dodgers

Floro was traded back to the Dodgers on July 4, 2018 (along with Zach Neal and international bonus pool space) in exchange for James Marinan and Aneurys Zabala. After being acquired, Floro posted strong numbers for the remainder of the season, posting an ERA of 1.63 in 29 games. He was the losing pitcher in Game 4 of the 2018 World Series.

In 2019, he appeared in 46.2 innings over 50 games for the Dodgers, with a 4.24 ERA and a record of 5–3.

In the pandemic-shortened 2020 season, he was 3–0 with a 2.59 ERA in 24.1 innings over 25 games. He pitched in one game in the 2020 NLDS, two games in the 2020 NLCS and three games in the 2020 World Series, allowing five runs in  innings but the Dodgers won the championship.

Miami Marlins
On February 12, 2021, the Dodgers traded Floro to the Miami Marlins in exchange for Alex Vesia and Kyle Hurt. On November 18, 2022, Floro signed a one-year, $3.9 million contract with the Marlins, avoiding arbitration.

Personal life
Floro and his wife, Amber, married in 2015 and have two daughters.

References

External links

Cal State Fullerton Titans bio

1990 births
Living people
People from Merced, California
People from Atwater, California
Baseball players from California
Major League Baseball pitchers
Tampa Bay Rays players
Chicago Cubs players
Cincinnati Reds players
Los Angeles Dodgers players
Miami Marlins players
Cal State Fullerton Titans baseball players
Hyannis Harbor Hawks players
Hudson Valley Renegades players
Bowling Green Hot Rods players
Charlotte Stone Crabs players
Montgomery Biscuits players
Durham Bulls players
Iowa Cubs players
Oklahoma City Dodgers players
Louisville Bats players
Rancho Cucamonga Quakes players